William George "Rams" Ramsay (born January 12, 1929, in Centralia, Washington) is an American jazz saxophonist and band leader based in Seattle.  In 1997, he was inducted into the Seattle Jazz Hall of Fame, the top of eight Golden Ear Award categories presented annually since 1990 by the Earshot Jazz Society of Seattle.  Ramsay performs on all the primary saxophones – soprano, alto, tenor, and baritone – as well as clarinet (his boyhood instrument), and bass clarinet.

Performance affiliations
Current
 Ramsay has been a member of the Seattle Repertory Jazz Orchestra since its founding in 1995.
 He is the co-leader, with Milton Edwin Kleeb (born 1919), of a ten-piece jazz band based in Seattle – the Ramsay-Kleeb Big Band.  The band plays the music of Miles Davis, Gil Evans, and Gerry Mulligan

Past
 Alto sax in the Buddy Morrow Band in the early 60s
 Bari sax in the Maynard Ferguson Band
 Lead alto sax in the Ray McKinley Band
 Tenor sax in the Benny Goodman Octet
 Bari sax in the Count Basie Orchestra for two years; Ramsay was hired in April 1984, three weeks before Basie died, to sub for Johnny C. Williams (born 1941), who had been hospitalized; Ramsay got the call from Basie's road manager, Sonny Cohn; Bobby Mitchell had recommended Ramsay to Basie after having heard him with the Benny Goodman Band
 Bari in the Duke Ellington Orchestra
 Toured with Les Brown, Frank Wess & Sweets Edison Band, Grover Mitchell's New York All Star Orchestra, Dennis Mackrel Jazz Orchestra, and Frankie Capp's "Juggernaut."
 Performed with the bands of Thad Jones, Cab Calloway, Mel Lewis, Gene Harris, and Quincy Jones
 In the 1980s, Ramsay led his own big band that performed Sundays at Parnall's Jazz Club in Seattle

Selected discography
As leader
 Ramsay-Kleeb Band, "Red" Kelly's Heros, C.A.R.S. Productions (Los Angeles) (Ramsay arranges, plays alto & clarinet, co-directs) (1997) 
 Note:  In the 1980s, Ramsay played tener sax with Thomas "Red" Kelly's quintet (jazz bass; 1927–2004), Carl Fontana (trombone), David H. Stetler (drums; 1923–2002), and Donald Wing Chan (piano; born 1941)
As arranger
 Jay Thomas with the Cedar Walton Trio, Easy Does It, Discovery (1984) 
 Trombone orchestration by Ramsay
As sideman
 Frank Wess–Harry Edison Orchestra, Dear Mr. Basie Concord Jazz (1989) 
 Grover Mitchell Orchestra, ''Hip Shakin, Ken Music (1990)  (see audio link below)
  also on Ken Music (Japan) & Ken/Passport (Germany)
 Jay Thomas, 360 Degrees (Ramsay plays alto, tenor, and is arranger) Hep Jazz  (1990) 
 Mel Torme with the Frank Wess Orchestra, Live at the Concord Jazz Festival, August 17, 1990, Concord Jazz 
 The Frank Wess Orchestra, Entre Nous, Live "Kan-i Hoken Hall", Tokyo, Japan, November 11, 1990 Concord Jazz 
 Becca Duran with the Jay Thomas Group, Hide & Seek, Discovery Records (1991) 
 Bud Shank, Lost Cathedral, (1995) 
 Seven Sensational Saxophones – Fujitsu-Concord 26Th Jazz Festival, Jesse Davis, Gary Foster, Bill Ramsay, Ken Peplowski, Chris Potter, Frank Wess, and Rickey Woodard (1994) 
 Edmonia Jarrett, Live Live Live, recorded at Triad Studios, Redmond, Washington (1996) 
 Jan Stentz, Forever, MNOP Records (1999) 
 Seattle Repertory Jazz Orchestra, SRJO Live, Origin Records (recorded in Seattle, 29 March 1997, released 2002) 
 Mel Tormé, Two Darn Hot: A Night at the Concord Pavilion/Live at the Fujitsu-Concord (2002) 
 Pete Christlieb, For Heaven's Sake, C.A.R.S. Productions (Los Angeles) (1999) 
 Jon Belcher & Savoy Swing, Till Tom Special, Irrational Behavior Productions (1999) 
 Charlie May All Star Big Band Plays the Arrangements of Gaylord Jones (2001) 
 Lance Buller, Let the Good Times Roll (2002) 
 Stephanie Porter, Mood Swings (2003) 
 Phil Kelly & the NW Prevailing Winds, Convergence Zone, Origin Records (2003) 
 Seattle Repertory Jazz Orchestra, Sacred Music of Duke Ellington, Origin Records (live performances at University Christian Church, Seattle 2001–2005, released 2006) 
 Phil Kelly & the SW Santa Ana Winds, My Museum, Origin Records (2006) 
 Bud Shank, Awakening (2006) 
 Jimmy Heath & the Seattle Jazz Orchestra, Endless Search, Origin Records (2010) 
 Phil Kelly & The Northwest Bouncing Beagles, Ballet of the Bouncing Beagles, Origin Records (2009) 
 Stix Hooper, Many Hats (2010) 
 Primo Kim Villaruz, Make it Right, R.K.K. Productions, Inc. (Bothell, Washington) (2010)
 Milt Kleeb Octet, Something if Nothing Else, Pony Boy Records (2011) Unpublished Bill Ramsay & the Hipshaker Big Band, Thaddeus, unpublished live recording at Tula's (2004)

Filmography
 A Tribute to Count Basie, filmed at Kan-i Hoken Hall, Tokyo, November 11, 1989 (film for television)
Personnel:  Harry "Sweets" Edison, Joe Newman, Snooky Young, Al Aarons, Ray Brown, trumpet; Al Grey, Benny Powell, Grover Mitchell, Michael Grey, trombone; Marshal Royal, Curtis Peagler, alto sax; Frank Wess, tenor sax, flute; Billy Mitchell, tenor sax; Bill Ramsay, baritone sax; Ronnell Bright, piano; Ted Dunbar, guitar; Eddie Jones, acoustic double bass; Gregg Fields, drums.
 Fujitsu Concord Jazz Festival, filmed at Kan-i Hoken Hall, Japan, November 11, 1990 (film for television)
 Personnel:  Ray Brown, Pete Minger, Joe Newman, Snooky Young, trumpet; Arthur Baron, Grover Mitchell, Dennis Wilson, Douglas Purviance, trombone; Bill Ramsay, Curtis Peagler, alto sax; Frank Wess, tenor sax, flute; Billy Mitchell, tenor sax; Babe Clarke, baritone sax; Tee Curson, piano; Ted Dunbar, guitar; Eddie Jones, acoustic double bass; Dennis Mackrel, drums, Mel Torme, vocal, drums.
 Diane Schuur: Live from Seattle - With Maynard Ferguson and His Big Bop Nouveau Band (2006) 

Service in the U.S. Armed Forces
From September 28, 1948, to June 25, 1952, Ramsay served in the U.S. Army.  He ended his tour with an honorable discharge.

FamilyParents 
 William George Ramsay was born in Washington to William Mathew Ramsay (1902–1969) and Edna Mae ( Forsythe; surname at death – Skramstad; 1902–1999).  William and Edna were married October 22, 1921, in Lewis County, Washington.  Edna remarried Thorvald N. Skramstad (1903–1989) in Centralia, Washington on March 26, 1972.Sister Bill Ramsay had one sister, Gloria Phyllis Ramsay (1923–2003), who, in 1946, married Tim Clarence Oconnell (1918–2008).Spouse Bill married Lillian ( Halstead; born 1931).Daughter 
 Bill and Lillian have a daughter, Jane Susan Ramsay (born 1952) and, grandson,  Maxfield Ramsay Marcus, (born 1993).

Audio & video links
 
  (Ramsay playing bari)
 , featuring Frank Wess and Doug Lawrence on tenors (Ramsay on bari in the sax section)

References

External links
 Seattle Repertory Jazz Orchestra official website

American jazz saxophonists
American male saxophonists
American music arrangers
Jazz arrangers
American jazz bandleaders
1929 births
Living people
Musicians from Seattle
21st-century American saxophonists
21st-century American male musicians
American male jazz musicians